Joseph Roger Adrien Picard (born January 13, 1935) is a Canadian former professional ice hockey player and minor league head coach who played 15 games in the National Hockey League (NHL). He played 15 games with the St. Louis Blues in the club's inaugural .

Roger is the brother of NHL player Noel Picard, who he played with for the St. Louis Blues.

Playing career
Picard was a member of the Montreal Canadiens farm teams before he went to play for the St. Louis Blues.

Montreal Lakeshore Royals - Metropolitan Montreal Junior Hockey League 1955–1957
Granby Victorias - Quebec Senior Hockey League 1957–1961
Montreal Olympics - ETIHL 1961–1962
Sherbrooke Castors - QEPHL 1962–1963
Kansas City Blues - CPHL 1966–1968
St. Louis Blues - NHL 1967–1968 (15 games)
Omaha Knights - CHL 1968–1969
Buffalo Bisons - AHL 1968–1969
Denver Spurs - WHL 1968–1969

Coaching career
After retiring he went on to become head coach with several teams in Quebec:

Rosemont Bombardiers - QJAHL 1973–1974
Laval Voisins - QMJHL 1981–1982
Granby Bisons - QMJHL 1982–1984

Personal
Outside of hockey Picard and his brother Noel bred and trained horse in Quebec.

References

External links

1935 births
Living people
Canadian ice hockey coaches
Canadian ice hockey right wingers
Granby Bisons coaches
Laval Voisins coaches
St. Louis Blues players
Ice hockey people from Montreal